is a city in Toyama Prefecture, Japan. It is in a mountainous area in the south-west corner of the prefecture just north of Gifu Prefecture. It is home to the Gokayama UNESCO World Heritage site. , the city had an estimated population of 51,669 in 17,761 households and a population density of 75.8 persons per km².

Geography
Nanto is located in the southwestern Toyama Prefecture, and is bordered by Ishikawa Prefecture to the west and Gifu Prefecture to the south. The northern part of the city is within the Tochi plains, and the southern portion of the city is mountainous. Much of the area is a dispersed settlement typical of this region of Japan. The different regions of Nanto consist of Fukuno, Fukumitsu, Johana, Inokuchi, and Inami.

Surrounding municipalities
Toyama Prefecture
 Oyabe
 Tonami
 Toyama
Ishikawa Prefecture
 Kanazawa
 Hakusan
Gifu Prefecture
 Hida
Shirakawa

Climate
Nanto has a humid continental climate (Köppen Cfa) characterized by mild summers and cold winters with heavy snowfall.  The average annual temperature in Nanto is 13.6 °C. The average annual rainfall is 2410 mm with September as the wettest month. The temperatures are highest on average in August, at around 26.3 °C, and lowest in January, at around 2.0 °C.

Demographics
Per Japanese census data, the population of Nanto has declined over the past 60 years.

History
The area of present-day Nanto was part of ancient Etchū Province.

The modern city of Nanto was established on November 1, 2004, from the merger of the towns of Fukuno, Inami and Jōhana, the villages of Inokuchi, Kamitaira, Taira and Toga (all from Higashitonami District), and the town of Fukumitsu (from Nishitonami District).

Government
Nanto has a mayor-council form of government with a directly elected mayor and a unicameral city legislature of 20 members.

The current Mayor is Mikio Tanaka who is currently serving his second term after initially being elected on November 16, 2008.

Industry
Nanto is home to the P.A. Works animation studio, which is responsible for making shows like Canaan, Angel Beats!, Charlotte, and Sakura Quest. Nanto is also the location of the headquarters of KAWADA Technologies Inc. as well as a head office of the Daiken Corporation. Nanto is also well known for the Inami woodcarving town, which is believed to have been practicing the craft since 1390 C.E.

Places of Interest/Tourist Locations

Gokayama

Gokayama is a area in Nanto that is a part of the UNESCO World Heritage List thanks to its traditional gassho built houses, which preserve a traditional architectural style that has a steep steeple shape to cope with the 2 to 3 meters of snow buildup the area gets in the winter. The village holds considerable history with some of the structures being dated back to the Nara Period (710 C.E.). Activities in the area in include participating in weaving and dying fabrics as well as making buckwheat (soba) noodles.

Zentokuji Temple
This temple in Johana was founded roughly 530 years ago. It is a major temple of the Otani sect of Pure Land Buddhism and is home to over 10,000 treasured items including a collection of writings from the sect founder Shinran.

Inami Woodcarving Town

In this village roughly 200 woodcarving artisans work and carve wooden pieces of art that fill the town. The town has been a center for the woodcarving industry in Japan for about 250 years. Many of the woodcarvings can be seen walking down Yokamachi Road from Zuisenji Temple. The temple is also known for the wood carvings in the architecture of the building.

IOX-AROSA
Located in Fukumitsu, in the summer, one can take a gondola up much of Mt. Iozen from here and get a view of most of Nanto City. In the winter it offers skiing and snowboarding down slopes from high up on the Mountain.

Education
Nanto has nine public elementary schools and eight public junior high schools operated by the town government, and three public high schools operated by the Toyama Prefectural Board of Education.

Transportation

Railway
West Japan Railway Company (JR West) - Jōhana Line
  -  -  -  -  -

Bus Routes
Kaetsuno Railway Bus Company
Toyama Chihō Railway High Speed Bus

Highway
Tōkai-Hokuriku Expressway

International relations
 – Shaoxing, Zhejiang, China, friendship city from March 1983
 – Delphi, Greece, friendship city from June 1986
 – Arosa, Switzerland, friendship city from September 1991
 – Pyeongchang County, South Korea, friendship city since September 2002
 – Tukuche, Nepal, sister city since January 1989
 – Marlboro, New Jersey, USA, sister city since May 2003

In media
The city Monoyama in the anime Sakura Quest is modeled after Nanto City where the anime studio P.A. Works is headquartered.

See also
Minami-Fukumitsu
Gokayama

References

External links

 

 
Cities in Toyama Prefecture